Takanori Hayashi ( Hayashi Takanori; 8 March 1938 – 3 September 2022) was a Japanese politician. A member of Kōmeitō, he served in the House of Representatives from 1969 to 1980.

Hayashi died of heart failure in Ikoma, on 3 September 2022, at the age of 84.

References

1938 births
2022 deaths
Japanese journalists
Japanese politicians
Members of the House of Representatives (Japan)
Komeito politicians
Kansai University alumni
Politicians from Osaka Prefecture